Clair Maurice Branch (b. March 30, 1937 - d. June 18, 2022) played the positions of fullback and linebacker for the Saskatchewan Roughriders of the Canadian Football League from 1960 to 1963.

He was born in Kenedy, Texas. Branch played college football at the University of Texas, where he rushed for a total of 565 yards and a 4.2 yards per rush average in 1956, 1957, and 1959. In 1960, Branch joined the Saskatchewan Roughriders and played four seasons with them. In his initial year, he rushed for 508 yards for a 4.8 yards per rush average. But from 1961 onwards, he was used mostly as a linebacker. In 1963, he played 4 games for the Roughriders and 4 with the  Edmonton Eskimos, where he rushed for only 75 yards and a 3.1 yard per rush average. He played only a single game with them in 1964 and 1965 with no rushing attempt during either year.

References

1937 births
2022 deaths
Canadian football linebackers
Canadian football running backs
Edmonton Elks players
People from Kenedy, Texas
Saskatchewan Roughriders players